The USCGC Bibb (WPG-31) was a  Secretary-Class (also known as "Treasury Class") Coast Guard ship commissioned in 1936. Seven similar "combat cutters" were built and named for secretaries of the United States Treasury. Bibb was named for U.S. Secretary of the Treasury (July 4, 1844 – March 7, 1845) George M. Bibb.

History
Bibb saw service in World War II. The ship fought in the Battle of the Atlantic serving as a convoy escort. Capt. Raney ignored the order to leave the survivors and went back and rescued 202 men from the icy waters. In 1944 Bibb provided convoy escort between the United States and North Africa — mainly to Bizerte in Tunisia. In January 1945 Bibb left Charleston, South Carolina for service in the Pacific theater where, as an AGC, she served temporarily as the flagship for Commander, Mine Craft, Pacific Fleet. Bibb is credited with destroying one Japanese kamikaze aircraft in action at Karema Retto.

In peacetime the Bibb spent time on ocean station providing weather information and beacons to trans-Atlantic traffic.  While on ocean station, the Bibb came to the rescue of the airliner, the Bermuda Sky Queen. In the Vietnam War, the Bibb transported John Kerry after he was shot on his Swift boat.

Fate
Bibb was decommissioned in 1985 and remained docked until it was transported to the Florida Keys for use as an artificial reef. The ship was sunk in November 1987 just outside the coral reef tract, about six miles (10 km) offshore of the island of Key Largo. Nearby, a second Treasury-Class ship, the USCGC Duane (WPG-33) was also sunk as an artificial reef.

Noteworthy crewmembers
Among those serving on Bibb was James A. Watson, a rear admiral who was the onsite ranking officer in the Deepwater Horizon oil spill.  Watson was an Engineering Officer/Student Engineer (1978-1980).

World War II convoys escorted

In popular culture
The USCGC Bibb appeared in the 1952 film "Walk East on Beacon" at the film's climactic end.

References

External links
 Bibb shipmates association
  uscg.mil/history: USCGC Bibb
 USCGC Bibb

Treasury-class cutters
Ships of the United States Coast Guard
Shipwrecks of the Florida Keys
1937 ships
Maritime incidents in 1987
Ships sunk as artificial reefs
Ships built in Charleston, South Carolina